Calochortus ghiesbreghtii is a Mesoamerican species of plants in the lily family. It is native to Guatemala and to the States of Hidalgo and Chiapas in Mexico.

Description
Calochortus ghiesbreghtii is a bulb-forming perennial herb. Flowers are upright, white to pale purple, sometimes with hairy glands near the base of the petals.

References

ghiesbreghtii
Flora of Guatemala
Flora of Mexico
Plants described in 1879